Avatha tepescoides is a species of moth of the family Erebidae. It is found on Borneo.

References

Moths described in 2005
Avatha
Moths of Indonesia